Pasečnice is a municipality in Domažlice District in the Plzeň Region of the Czech Republic. It has about 200 inhabitants.

Administrative parts
The municipality is made up of villages of Nová Pasečnice and Stará Pasečnice.

References

Villages in Domažlice District